was a Japanese manga artist who became an influential figure in manga, anime, and , creating several immensely popular long-running series such as Cyborg 009, the Super Sentai series (later adapted into the Power Rangers series), and the Kamen Rider series. He was twice awarded by the Shogakukan Manga Awards, in 1968 for Sabu to Ichi Torimono Hikae and in 1988 for Hotel and Manga Nihon Keizai Nyumon.

Career

In December 1954, Ishinomori published his first work, Nikyuu Tenshi, in Manga Shōnen. In 1956, he moved to Tokyo and became an assistant to Osamu Tezuka. During his time working under Tezuka, Ishinomori worked on Astro Boy and Alakazam the Great. In 1960, Ishinomori published Flying Phantom Ship, which was later turned into an animated feature film in 1969.

Cyborg 009, created in 1963, became the first superpowered hero team created in Japan, featuring nine cybernetic warriors. That same year, Kazumasa Hirai and Jiro Kuwata created Japan's first android superhero series, 8 Man (which predated Ishinomori's Kikaider by nine years). The success of the  superhero TV series Kamen Rider, produced by Toei Company in 1971, led to the birth of the "transforming" (henshin) superhero (human-sized superheroes who transform by doing a pose, and use martial arts to fight henchmen and the weekly monster), and resulted in many sequel shows to this day. Ishinomori then created many similar superhero dramas, which were once again all produced by Toei or in Sarutobi Ecchan's case Toei Animation, including Android Kikaider, Kikaider 01, Henshin Ninja Arashi, Inazuman, Robotto Keiji, Himitsu Sentai Gorenger (the first Super Sentai series), Kaiketsu Zubat, Akumaizer 3, Sarutobi Ecchan, the Toei Fushigi Comedy Series, and countless others. He even created popular children's shows, such as Hoshi no Ko Chobin (Chobin, Child of the Stars, 1974, a co-production with Studio Zero which was a major success on Italian television) and Ganbare!! Robokon. In 1963, he also founded the anime company Studio Zero. From 1967 to 1970, the manga 009-1 was serialized in the Futabasha publication Weekly Manga Action. It was written and illustrated by Ishinomori. There was a television drama of it in 1969 and eventually an anime in 2006.

Ishinomori's art is reminiscent of that of his mentor, Osamu Tezuka. The true story of his first meeting with Tezuka was illustrated in a short four-page tale drawn up as supplementary material for the 1970s Astro Boy manga reprints. In 1954, Ishinomori submitted his first official work, Nikyu Tenshi, to a contest seeking new talent in the magazine, Manga Shōnen. Tezuka was impressed by his drawings and sent a telegraph to Ishinomori, asking him to work as his assistant with Astro Boy. In the American release, this story can be seen in Volume 15, along with Ishinomori's earliest work on the "Electro" story arc. After graduating from high school in 1956 Ishinomori moved to Tokiwa-so with Tezuka, and lived there until the end of 1961.

Ishinomori also illustrated a comic adaptation of the Super NES video game The Legend of Zelda: A Link to the Past, which was produced for the American publication Nintendo Power. The comic consisted of 12 chapters, which were serialized from January 1992 (Volume 32) to December 1992 (Volume 43). The comic was republished as a graphic novel collection in 1993, and, as of 2015, is back in print through Viz Media.

At the end of 1997, Kazuhiko Shimamoto, a young and up-and-coming manga artist was contacted by an increasingly ill Ishinomori and asked if he would do a continuation (though more along the lines of a remake) of his 100-page, one-shot manga from 1970, Skull Man (the manga that became the basis for Kamen Rider). Ishinomori, who had been one of Shimamoto's boyhood heroes, faxed him copies of the proposed story and plot notes. Shimamoto was astounded that he had been chosen to work on his idol's final, great work.

Shimamoto had already been involved in the revival of one of Ishinomori's other earlier works (including Kamen Rider) but little did he dream that, as only one of many whom Ishinomori had inspired, he would be chosen for the final collaboration and resurrection of Skull Man. It was also adapted into an anime in 2007.

Death and legacy

Ishinomori died of heart failure on 28 January 1998, just three days after his 60th birthday. His final work was the  superhero TV series, Voicelugger, televised a year later. Two years later, the Kamen Rider series would be revived with Kamen Rider Kuuga. All of the series made in the Heisei period credit Ishinomori as the creator. The Ishinomori Manga Museum named in his honor opened in Ishinomaki, Miyagi, in 2001. Special trains in the Senseki Line were commissioned featuring his artwork generally leading to the museum.

His work posthumously awarded him the Guinness World Record for most comics published by one author, totaling over 128,000 pages across 770 titles across 500 volumes.

Manga artists that have cited Ishinomori as an influence include Katsuhiro Otomo, Naoki Urasawa and Tetsuo Hara.

Fuku Suzuki portrays a young Ishinomori in Saber + Zenkaiger: Superhero Senki.

Selected works

References

External links

Ishimori Production Inc. – Official website 
Ishimori Production Inc. – Official website
Ishimori Production Inc. – Official website 
Mangattan Museum website 
Shotaro Ishinomori Complete Comic Works 
Shotaro Ishinomori Memorial Museum – Official website 
Entry in The Encyclopedia of Science Fiction

 
1938 births
1998 deaths
Anime character designers
Manga artists from Miyagi Prefecture
Winner of Tezuka Osamu Cultural Prize (Special Award)